Parallelia is a genus of moths in the family Erebidae. The genus was erected by Jacob Hübner in 1818.

Taxonomy
Research by Jeremy Daniel Holloway and Scott E. Miller (2003) suggests that this should be a monotypic genus, with Parallelia bistriaris as the only species. A number of species have been moved to other genera, but some were retained in Parallelia until a suitable genus is found.

Species
 Parallelia bistriaris Hübner, 1818 – maple looper moth

Temporarily places here
 Parallelia aviceps (Warren, 1915)
 Parallelia conspicua (Warren, 1915)
 Parallelia cuneilineata (Warren, 1915)
 Parallelia curvilimes (Warren, 1915)

References

Poaphilini
Moth genera